Norut Northern Research Institute is a research and innovation company in Norway that produces knowledge with practical applicability relevant to the High North within technology and social science.

Norut consists of the following companies:
Norut
Norut Narvik
Norinnova Technology Transfer
Barents Biocentre Lab

External links
 http://norut.no/en

Alta, Norway
Tromsø
Narvik
Education in Nordland
Education in Troms og Finnmark
Research institutes in Norway